Albion Hotel may refer to multiple buildings:

 Albion Hotel, Balmain, New South Wales, Australia
 Albion Hotel, Braidwood, New South Wales, Australia
 Albion Hotel, Cottesloe, Western Australia, Australia

See also
 Royal Albion Hotel, Brighton, England
 Hotel Albion, Portland, Oregon, United States